The 1998 Taça de Portugal Final was the final match of the 1997–98 Taça de Portugal, the 58th season of the Taça de Portugal, the premier Portuguese football cup competition organized by the Portuguese Football Federation (FPF). The match was played on 24 May 1998 at the Estádio Nacional in Oeiras, and opposed two Primeira Liga sides Braga and Porto. Porto defeated Braga 3–1 to claim the Taça de Portugal for a ninth time in their history.

In Portugal, the final was televised live on RTP. As Porto claimed both league and cup double in the same season, cup runners-up Braga faced their cup final opponents in the 1998 Supertaça Cândido de Oliveira.

Match

Details

References

1998
1997–98 in Portuguese football
FC Porto matches
S.C. Braga matches